Below is a continuation of the North America section of the List of library associations. Included are state associations, school library associations, and special library associations that are specific to an American state.

Alabama
Alabama Library Association Website
Alabama School Library Association Website

Alaska
Alaska Library Association Website

Arizona
Arizona Library Association Website

Arkansas
Arkansas Library Association Website

California
ARLIS/NA Northern California Website
California Academic & Research Libraries Association Website
California Library Association Website
Los Angeles Chapter of Association for Information Science & Technology Website
LILi: Lifelong Information Literacy Website
Society of California Archivists Website

Colorado
Colorado Association of Libraries Website
Colorado Library Consortium CLiC website

Connecticut
Connecticut Library Association Website

Delaware
Delaware Library Association Website
Delaware Association of School Librarians Website

District of Columbia
District of Columbia Library Association Website

Florida
Florida Library Association Website
Florida Association for Media in Education Website
 Palm Beach County Library Association

Georgia
Atlanta Law Libraries Association Website
Georgia Health Sciences Library Association Website
Georgia Library Association Website
Georgia Library Media Association, Inc. Website

Hawaii
Hawaii Library Association Website

Idaho
Cache Valley Library Association Website
Idaho Library Association Website

Illinois
Illinois Library Association Website
Illinois School Library Media Association Website

Indiana
Association of Indiana School Library Educators Website
Indiana Black Librarians Network Website
Indiana Chapter of Special Libraries Association Website
Indiana Health Sciences Librarians Association Website
Indiana Library Federation Website
Indiana Online Users Group Website
Indiana Public Library Association Website

Iowa
Iowa Library Association Website

Kansas
Kansas Library Association Website

Kentucky
Kentucky Library Association Website
Kentucky Public Library Association Website
Kentucky Association of School Librarians Website

Louisiana
Louisiana Library Association Website

Maine
Maine Association of School Libraries Website
Maine Library Association Website

Maryland
Maryland Association of School Libraries Website
Maryland Library Association Website

Massachusetts
Massachusetts Library Association Website

Michigan
Michigan Library Association Website
Michigan Academic Library Association    Website
Michigan Health Sciences Library Association  Website

Minnesota
Minnesota Library Association Website

Mississippi
Mississippi Library Association Website

Missouri
Missouri Association of School Librarians Website
Missouri Library Association Website

Montana
Montana Library Association Website

Nebraska
Nebraska Library Association Website

Nevada
Nevada Library Association Website

New Hampshire
New Hampshire Library Association Website
New Hampshire Library Trustees Association Website
New Hampshire School Library Media Association Website

New Jersey
New Jersey Library Association Website

New Mexico
New Mexico Library Association Website

New York
Metropolitan New York Library Council (METRO) Website
New York Library Association Website

North Carolina
North Carolina Library Association Website
North Carolina School Library Media Association Website
North Carolina Special Libraries Association Website

North Dakota
North Dakota Library Association Website

Ohio
Academic Library Association of Ohio Website
Ohio Educational Library Media Association Website
Ohio Library Council Website

Oklahoma
Oklahoma Library Association Website

Oregon
Oregon Library Association Website

Pennsylvania
Pennsylvania Library Association Website

Rhode Island
Rhode Island Library Association Website

South Carolina
South Carolina Library Association Website

South Dakota
South Dakota Library Association Website

Tennessee
Tennessee Association of School Libraries Website
Tennessee Library Association Website
Tenn-Share Website

Texas
Texas Library Association Website

Utah
Cache Valley Library Association Website
Utah Library Association Website
Utah Educational Library Media Association Website

Vermont
Vermont Library Association Website

Virginia
Virginia Library Association Website

Washington
Washington Library Association Website

West Virginia
West Virginia Library Association Website

Wisconsin
Wisconsin Library Association Website

Wyoming
Wyoming Library Association Website

See also
American Library Association
Library
Public Library

Non-profit organizations based in the United States by state
Library